Amlanjyoti Das (born 15 January 2002) is an Indian cricketer. He made his List A debut on 7 October 2019, for Assam in the 2019–20 Vijay Hazare Trophy. He made his Twenty20 debut on 10 January 2021, for Assam in the 2020–21 Syed Mushtaq Ali Trophy. He made his first-class debut on 17 February 2022, for Assam in the 2021–22 Ranji Trophy.

References

External links
 

2002 births
Living people
Indian cricketers
Assam cricketers
Place of birth missing (living people)